Jack Forsyth "Cy" McClairen  (March 2, 1931 – December 28, 2020) was an American professional football player and college coach.  He played as an end for the Pittsburgh Steelers of the National Football League (NFL). He was selected in the 1953 NFL Draft, but served a two-year stint in the Army. At Bethune–Cookman University, McClairen had duties as head coach in football and basketball as well as duties as athletic director. He served as head football coach from 1961 to 1972 and again from 1994 to 1996. He also coached the most wins for men's basketball in Bethune–Cookman history, having amassed a record of 397–427 in 31 total seasons.

McClairen died on December 28, 2020.

Head coaching record

Football

See also
 List of college football head coaches with non-consecutive tenure

References

External links
 

1931 births
2020 deaths
African-American coaches of American football
African-American players of American football
African-American basketball coaches
African-American basketball players
American football ends
American men's basketball players
Basketball coaches from Florida
Basketball players from Florida
Bethune–Cookman Wildcats athletic directors
Bethune–Cookman Wildcats football coaches
Bethune–Cookman Wildcats football players
Bethune–Cookman Wildcats men's basketball coaches
Bethune–Cookman Wildcats men's basketball players
Pittsburgh Steelers players
Eastern Conference Pro Bowl players
People from Panama City, Florida
Coaches of American football from Florida
Players of American football from Florida
Military personnel from Florida
20th-century African-American sportspeople
21st-century African-American sportspeople